Following are the results of the Ukrainian Football Amateur League 2003 season.  Participation is restricted to the regional (Oblast) champions and/or the most regarded team by the respective regional association.

This season competition consisted of four stages as the previous. Few little changes were added this season's format. First two stages were organized in regional principal and were played in two rounds where each team could play another at its home ground. On the first stage each group winners and their immediate runners-up were to advance to the next part of the competition. The second stage was split in four groups where first two places were advancing to the semifinals. On the second stage teams that played each other in the previous one kept their result from the first stage. The semifinals and finals, on the other hand, were played in one round and this year were organized in the cities of Severodonetsk and Rubizhne. The semifinals, in their turn, were split in two groups where first two teams were advancing to the winners final of four. And as the qualifying stages (the first two) the teams that played in semifinals did not play in the final as their results were kept from that stage.

Note: ZALK stands for the Zaporizhzhian Aliuminum Plant (Kombinat in Ukrainian).
KZEZO stands for the Kakhovkan Factory (Zavod) of Electro-Welding Equipment (Elektro-Zvariuvalnoho Obladnannia).

Teams

Returning

Debut
List of teams that are debuting this season in the league.

Withdrawn
List of clubs that took part in last year competition, but chose not to participate in 2003 season:

Location map

First stage
Note: Some records are not full.

Group A

Note: Four games were forfeited.

Group B

Note: Dovira-Nyva Vinnytsia forfeited 6 games.

Group C

Note: Last two games Ikar MAKBO 94 Kirovohrad forfeited.
Nizhyn withdrew after this qualification.

Group D

Group E

Group F

Second stage

Group 1

Note: KLO-CSKA Bucha changed to FC KLO Bucha.
KLO Bucha replaced Fakel Varva in Semifinals.

Group 2

Group 3

Semifinals

Group 1

Group 2

Final Group

Ukrainian Football Amateur League seasons
Amateur
Amateur